Antoni Tołkaczewski (19 December 1933 – 7 September 2021) was a Polish former swimmer. He competed in the men's 4 × 200 metre freestyle relay at the 1952 Summer Olympics.

References

External links
 

1933 births
2021 deaths
Polish male freestyle swimmers
Olympic swimmers of Poland
Swimmers at the 1952 Summer Olympics
Swimmers from Warsaw
20th-century Polish people